The 2017 Zagreb local elections were held on 21 May and 4 June 2017 for the Mayor of Zagreb and members of the Zagreb Assembly. Milan Bandić, the 52nd and incumbent mayor since 2005 (previously also the 50th mayor from 2000 to 2002), ran for a sixth 4-year term. As no candidate won an absolute majority of the vote in the first round, a second round of elections took place on 4 June 2017 between the two highest-placed candidates in terms of popular vote: incumbent mayor Milan Bandić of the Bandić Milan 365 - Labour and Solidarity Party and former Minister of Construction Anka Mrak Taritaš of the Croatian People's Party - Liberal Democrats. In the run-off Bandić won re-election as mayor, taking 51.8% of the votes against 46% for Mrak Taritaš (with 2.1% of the votes being blank or invalid). Turnout for the election was 47.7% in the first round and 41.2% in the second round.

As Zagreb, being the national capital, is the only Croatian city to enjoy a special status within Croatia's regional administrative framework (being both a city and a county), the mayor of Zagreb likewise also enjoys a status equal to that of a county prefect (Croatian: župan) of one of Croatia's other 20 counties (Croatian: županija).

This was the third direct election for the mayor of Zagreb (simultaneously held with elections for all other county prefects and mayors in Croatia) since the popular vote method was introduced in 2009, as previously those officials had been elected by their county or city assemblies and councils.

Results

Mayoral election

Assembly election

Councils of districts

Councils of local committees

Opinion polls
Poll results are listed in the tables below in reverse chronological order, showing the most recent first, and using the date the survey's fieldwork was done, as opposed to the date of publication. If such date is unknown, the date of publication is given instead. The highest percentage figure in each polling survey is displayed in bold, and the background shaded in the leading party's color. In the instance that there is a tie, then no figure is shaded. The lead column on the right shows the percentage-point difference between the two parties with the highest figures. When a specific poll does not show a data figure for a party, the party's cell corresponding to that poll is shown as not announced (N/A).

First round

2017

2014–2016

Second round

Bandić–Švaljek

Bandić–Mrak Taritaš

Švaljek–Mrak Taritaš

Individual party standings

See also
2017 Croatian local elections
List of mayors in Croatia
List of mayors of Zagreb

References 

Zagreb 2021
Zagreb local election
Elections in Zagreb
2010s in Zagreb